Arroz con leche (English: Rice Pudding) is a 2007 Venezuelan telenovela written by Doris Segui for Venevisión and distributed internationally by Venevisión International.

Eileen Abad, Marlene De Andrade, and Alba Roversi star as the main protagonists, accompanied by Juan Carlos Garcia, Luis Gerónimo Abreu, Henry Soto, and Carlos Cruz.

Plot
Arroz con Leche revolves around the lives of three sisters as they try to find love in their unhappy lives. In the process, they discover that the path to discovering love is very difficult. Wenclaso is an older man left to raise his three daughters Belen, Amanda and Teresa alone after the death of their mother, Manuela. The three sisters have lived in the shadow of their deceased mother after their father still idolized Manuela even after her death.

Teresa (Alba Roversi) is an intellectual, radio presenter married to Jose Manuel "Chepo" (Manuel Salazar), a man who is unfaithful to her. Her marriage is in crisis, and she finds herself in a situation whereby she cannot use the relationship advice that she gives to her listeners to solve her own situation.

Amanda (Marlene De Andrade) is a housewife married to Thomas (Carlos Cruz), a sexist man who only thinks of himself. Frustrated by only being seen as a housewife and mother of two, she gets an opportunity of running a beauty salon in order to prove that she can also be successful in business. However, she finds true love with Rodrigo(Juan Carlos Garcia), an unhappily married man whose wife Cecilia is extremely jealous and threatens their newly found love.

Belén (Eileen Abad) is the youngest of the sisters who is left pregnant after discovering that her husband Danton (Henry Soto) is a polygamous man with three other marriages in which none of the women are aware that their husband has other wives.

Cast
 Eileen Abad as Belén Pacheco de Morales
 Marlene De Andrade as Amanda Pacheco
 Alba Roversi as Teresa Pacheco
 Luis Gerónimo Abreu as Simón Herrera
 Juan Carlos García as Rodrigo
 Mónica Pasqualotto as Cecilia (Villain, turns good. Divorces Rodrigo)
 Anastasia Mazzone as Isabela (Villain, ends up in a madhouse)
 Manuel Salazar as José Manuel "Chepo"
 Alejandro Mata as Wenceslao
 Astrid Carolina Herrera as Abril
 Henry Soto as Dantón Morales (Villain. Abandons his 3 wives and escapes to Colombia)
 Carlos Cruz as Tomás (Villain. Divorces Amanda in the end)
 Ileana Jacket as Margot Ferretti (Villain. Ends up alone and poor)
 Zoe Bolívar as Mireya
 Cindy da Silva as Victoria
 Elaiza Gil as Estrella
 Milena Santander 
 Jean Carlo Simancas as El Chef
 Ana María Simón es Sylvia
 Paula Woyzechowsky es Yurika
 Erika Schwarzgruber es Eugenia

References

External links
 

Venevisión telenovelas
2007 telenovelas
Venezuelan telenovelas
2007 Venezuelan television series debuts
2008 Venezuelan television series endings
Spanish-language telenovelas
Television shows set in Caracas